Cirkliškis Manor is a former residential manor in Cirkliškis,  southwest from Švenčionys. Main manor building is built in classicism style, has two floors, main facade consists of 6 columns portico. Smithy, icehouse and 35 hectares park have also remained until nowadays.

References

Manor houses in Lithuania
Classicism architecture in Lithuania